General O'Connor may refer to:

Arthur O'Connor (United Irishman) (1763–1852), French Army general under Napoleon
Denis O'Connor (British Army officer) (1907–1988), British Army lieutenant general
Douglas O'Connor (fl. 1950s–2000s), U.S. Army major general
Edmund F. O'Connor (1922–2016), U.S. Air Force lieutenant general
George G. O'Connor (1914–1971), U.S. Army lieutenant general
Gordon O'Connor (born 1939), Canadian Army brigadier general
Luke Smythe O'Connor (1806–1873), British Army major general
Luke O'Connor (1831–1915), British Army major general
Richard O'Connor (1889–1981), British Army general